KiKA (contraction of Der KinderKAnal von ARD und ZDF [The Children's Channel of ARD and ZDF]) is a German free-to-air television channel based in Erfurt, Germany. It is managed by a joint venture by public-service broadcasters ARD and ZDF. Its intended audience is children and the youth, and it is generally watched by children 3 to 13.

The channel also repeats shows, such as Tabaluga tivi from ZDF's main service.

Mascot

KiKA's mascot is the puppet character Bernd das Brot, a chronically depressed loaf of bread.

Announcers
The channel uses live continuity announcers. Four of the most popular announcers were Juri Tetzlaff (1997–2010), Karsten Blumenthal (1997–2004), Singa Gätgens (1997–2010), and Lukas Koch (2003-2009).

History
In the channel’s early years, the program consisted mostly of series and shows that were already being broadcast on ARD and ZDF. Whole programs were being broadcast simultaneously on the mother channels and the children’s channel, for example the afternoon program of ZDF. KiKa showed German as well as international series, like cartoon classics from the 1970s and 80s (Heidi, Biene Maja, Wickie or Nils Holgersson). Classics of children’s TV like film versions of Astrid Lindgren books or the Augsburger Puppenkiste were also regularly being broadcast.

After a time, more original broadcasts started appearing in KiKa’s program, like Schloss Einstein, The Tribe, and Teletubbies.

The all-girl popular music band Saphir was formed of the 2007-2010 winners of the talent show KI.KA LIVE — Beste Stimme gesucht! (Best Voice Wanted).

There have been some changes in the programming in recent years. Although it had been one of the channel's original aims to broadcast both animated and  live-action series, the former now predominate (85%). Apart from the numerous animated series, the afternoon soap opera Schloss Einstein is currently almost the sole live-action series in KiKA's lineup during the day. There are only two other live-action shows, one of which is aired in the afternoon and the other in the evening.

The channel sometimes offers continuous rebroadcasts of series that have come to an end. Similar to the procedure of private commercial stations, these series are broadcast as double features. But most of the older series, which had been repeatedly broadcast from 1997 to 2004, are currently excluded from the lineup. The fact that ARD and ZDF no longer own the appropriate broadcasting rights partly accounts for this.

The difference between the weekday and the weekend programming keeps vanishing steadily, since many series are aired daily. Thus some series, such as Pet Alien, Being Ian, and Jakers! The Adventures of Piggley Winks, are almost continually part of the programme.

Augsburger Puppenkiste, a rather old German television programme which had always been on the air on Saturday and Sunday mornings, ceased being broadcast on KiKA for four years but returned to the channel's lineup in April 2008. Many programmes, especially older series, such as Pan Tau, Pippi Longstocking, and Es war einmal, can be seen only on the ZDF and regional channels.

Two children's movies are aired on KiKA, on Fridays and Sundays; these are  more often animated films rather than live-action films.

The channel on 8 July 2020 announced that they will participate in the Junior Eurovision Song Contest for the first time with the 2020 edition in Warsaw, Poland, the entry will be chosen in a national selection by members ARD and ZDF, it will also be written by singer-songwriter Levent Geiger, a finalist in a children's show  in 2015 and 2019.

Kikaninchen 

Kikanichen is a blue friendly rabbit, which is a segment on kika that airs on weekdays only between 6:00AM and somewhere around 10:30AM. There, they air Preschool shows. His friends are Anni, Jule and Christian. He also loves playing fun and educational games with other kids or his friends.

Logos

Programming

 Beutolomäus
 Bernd das Brot
 Berndivent
 Chili TV
 Dein Song
 Die Pfefferkörner
 Die Sendung mit der Maus
 Fortsetzung folgt
 Junior Eurovision Song Contest
 Kikaninchen
 KiKA Baumhaus
 KiKA Kummerkasten
 KiKA Live
 Krimi.de
 logo!
 Löwenzahn
 Odo
 Sandmännchen
 Schloss Einstein
 Sonntagsmärchen
 Willi wills wissen
 Wissen macht Ah!
 Wunderkind Little Amadeus

Third Party series

 AstroKids (UK)
 Bitz & Bob (Canada)
 Being Ian (Canada)
 Clifford the Big Red Dog (US)
 Cosmic Quantum Ray (France)
 The Cramp Twins (UK)
 Doki  (Canada)
 Fireman Sam (UK)
 Lloyd of the Flies (UK)
 Step Up! (UK)
 Super Wings (South Korea, also see: Super RTL)
 Wunschpunsch (Canada)
 Titeuf (Switzerland)
 Zoé Kézako (France)
 The Smurfs (Belgium)
 The Three Friends and Jerry (Sweden)
 The Travels of the Young Marco Polo'' (Ireland)

See also
List of German language television channels

References

External links

Tabaluga tivi's website 

Mitteldeutscher Rundfunk
ARD (broadcaster)
ZDF
Children's television networks
Television stations in Germany
Mass media in Erfurt
Television channels and stations established in 1997
1997 establishments in Germany
German-language television stations